Aggression and Violent Behavior is a bimonthly peer-reviewed scientific journal covering the study of violent behavior. It was established in 1996 and is published by Elsevier. The editor-in-chief is Izabela Zych (Universidad de Córdoba).

Abstracting and indexing 
The journal is abstracted and indexed in:
 Current Contents/Social & Behavioral Sciences
 Social Sciences Citation Index
 Sociological Abstracts
 Scopus
According to the Journal Citation Reports, the journal has a 2021 impact factor of 4.874.

References

External links

Criminology journals
Elsevier academic journals
Bimonthly journals
Publications established in 1996
English-language journals
Psychology journals
Violence journals